Munjoy Hill is a neighborhood and prominent geographical feature of Portland, Maine.  It is located east of downtown and south of East Deering, the neighborhood it is connected to by Tukey's Bridge. The neighborhood historically had a large Irish and Italian American population.

Geography

At the northeastern end of Portland's peninsula, Munjoy Hill overlooks the downtown and harbor to the south, Casco Bay and its islands to the east and north, and shallow Back Cove to the west. The Eastern Promenade rings the neighborhood and offers panoramic views of these features, as well as two lighthouses, Mason Station power plant, and the stone battlement of Fort Gorges.

Though less than a mile from the heart of downtown Portland and Interstate Highway 295, Munjoy Hill is relatively free of traffic. While densely settled, it is almost exclusively residential and due to the shape of the peninsula it is isolated from the major commuter routes. Congress Street, downtown Portland's main artery, ends quietly at the Eastern Promenade. Washington Avenue, crossing from the other side of Back Cove, might be considered the boundary of the neighborhood, with Fox Street and India Street areas merging into the downtown and Bayside areas.

The most significant land feature of Munjoy Hill is Eastern Promenade, a park designed by the Olmsted Brothers design firm, as was Baxter Boulevard, which rings part of Back Cove. This Olmsted park has water vistas wrapping from the sunset view at the Loring memorial above the shore for over a mile to a sunrise view over the Calendar Islands of Casco Bay and Portland Head Light, and ending at Fort Allen Park with a full sweep of Portland Harbor. The park includes a series of broad rolling fields, public gardens, monuments, playgrounds and ball courts on top of the bluff and, along the waterfront, East End Beach, picnic areas, and a municipal boat launch. The Maine Narrow Gauge Railroad Co. & Museum operates 2-foot gauge steam and diesel tourist trains along the Casco Bay shore of the peninsula. The shoreway trail, which begins in South Portland, runs next to the railroad line and connects with the Baxter Boulevard trail, all suitable for walking, running, and cycling. The small public beach is a favorite of kayakers, families, and, after 5 PM, dog owners and their pets. The launch is often used to ferry heavy equipment to the city's outlying islands, including Peaks, Little Diamond and Great Diamond Islands. Another park, Fort Sumner Park (also known as Standpipe Park), on North Street, offers views of downtown.

The East End Beach is a small beach on the eastern side of Munjoy Hill.

Prominent buildings

At the center of Munjoy Hill, on the crest of the hill (between Kellogg and St Lawrence Streets)  are the Portland Observatory, the neighborhood fire station (housing Engine 1, Ladder 1, and Ladder 5) and Hilltop Superette. Nearby on Congress Street are a laundromat, Rosemont Market, Hilltop Coffee, and three restaurants – Blue Spoon, The Front Room, and Lolita.

Housing in the neighborhood is a mix of single- and multi-family structures. There are many triple-deckers, especially on Vesper, Morning, and North Streets. Many of these are rental units, with some condominiums. Only a small proportion have more than three units.

Until March 2006, the neighborhood had two elementary schools, Jack Elementary School and the Marada Adams School. Jack was found to be contaminated with mold, closed and was demolished. Its students were relocated to other city schools pending the construction of a unified East End School to replace both Jack and Adams. The East End School opened to students in September 2006. The local polling place and public library branch services from the Adams school were moved to the East End School as well. The Portland Public Library's Munjoy Hill branch, within the East End school, was closed in 2010.  The space now holds the school's own library.

There is a small, arts-based, neighborhood preschool, on Lafayette Street, called The Schoolhouse.

The St. Lawrence Arts Center is home to Good Theater Productions and other arts events year-round.

The J.J. Nissen Bakery building on Washington Avenue at its peak employed around 250 workers. It ceased production in 1999 and was then converted into office space.

Education
Beginning in 2006, the neighborhood was served by the East End Community School, which was built following the closure of Jack Elementary and Marada Adams schools.

Parks
Munjoy Hill is home to a number of parks. The Eastern Promenade is one of Portland's most scenic and highly used public spaces. Other parks include Fort Sumner Park (also called Standpipe Park) on North Street. The park is now privately owned, and the origin of the name is unknown. In the 1950s and '60s  - perhaps earlier - neighbors referred to it as "Shailer Park", likely due to its being next door to Shailer School. When publicly owned, it was officially Fort Sumner Park, named for the fort which had been located there. (The area at the end of North Street named erroneously on many maps as Fort Sumner Park is Loring Memorial Park. There was a stand pipe in the area, but it, and a reservoir, was located at the corner of North and Walnut Street where there are now apartments.)

Fort Allen Park

Fort Allen was probably originally built in 1775, may have served as part of Fort Sumner, and was rebuilt by the city and used to guard Portland during the War of 1812 due to its high vantage point overlooking Casco Bay. In 2012, a local non-profit group, Friends of the Eastern Promenade, sought to restore Fort Allen Park to its original look. As of 2016 this has resulted in additional interpretive plaques throughout the park, along with other improvements.

Some sources state that Fort Allen dates from 1775 and was originally named for Revolutionary War hero Ethan Allen. It was initially a half-moon battery mounting five guns. After 1794 it may have served as the "detached battery" of nearby Fort Sumner, as described in the Secretary of War's report for 1811. Fort Allen was rebuilt in 1814 with city resources, adding a magazine and barracks due to the British capture of Eastport and Castine in the War of 1812. A plaque at the park states that at this time it was named for Master Commandant William Henry Allen, a naval officer mortally wounded in the War of 1812.

Notable residents
 Justin Alfond, state legislator
 Joseph E. Brennan, Governor of Maine (1979–87) and Congressman (1987–91)
 Benjamin F. Dudley, state legislator
 John Ford, film director
 J. Elizabeth Mitchell, state legislator and healthcare advocate
 Anne Rand, state legislator
 Diane Russell, state legislator

See also
 Seacoast defense in the United States

References

 Munjoy Hill Neighborhood Organization
  History of Portland, Maine (1865)
 History of Portland, Maine (1886)

External links
 City of Portland, Maine
 Portland Observatory -- Greater Portland Landmarks
 St. Lawrence Arts & Community Center
 Portland Public Library -- Munjoy Hill Branch
 Portland Fire Department -- Munjoy Station
 Maine Narrow Gauge Railroad Co. & Museum
 Historic District

 
Geography of Portland, Maine
Irish-American culture in Maine
Irish-American neighborhoods
Italian-American culture
Neighborhoods in Portland, Maine